Warinus of Poitiers (also Warin, Guerin, Gerinus, Varinus; died 677 AD) was the Franco-Burgundian Count of Poitiers and Count of Paris. He was from an established noble family. He opposed Ebroin's efforts to expand Neustrian power and was killed at Arras in 677.

Life
Warinus was born in Autun, Saône-et-Loire, Burgundy, the son of Bodilon, Count of Poitiers and his wife Sigrada of Alsace. She was from the Syagrii family of Gallo-Roman Patricians. His maternal uncle was Dido (Desiderius), Bishop of Poitiers; his brother Leodegar became Bishop of Autun.

Warinus spent his childhood at the court of Chlothar II.

Like his brother, Warinus was an opponent of the Neustrian Mayor of the Palace, Ebroin, who sought to impose Neustrian authority over Burgundy and Austrasia. After Ebroin's victory, Warinus was stoned to death near Arras in 677 AD.

Family
He married Gunza von Treves, a noblewoman from an influential Frankish family, and the sister of Saint Basinus of Treves. Their children were:

 Leudwinus (born 660 AD - died 722 AD),  Archbishop of Treves and Laon
 Grimgert, Count of Paris (born c. 667 AD)

References

External links
 
 

7th-century Christian saints
677 deaths
Year of birth unknown
Deaths by stoning
7th-century Christian martyrs